"Come Back and Stay" is a song by Bad Boys Blue from their third studio album Love Is No Crime. Released as a single in late 1987, it peaked at number 18 in West Germany for two weeks. It was the first single by the group to feature John McInerney on lead vocals.

Composition 
The song was written and produced by Tony Hendrik and Karin Hartmann (as Karin van Haaren).

Charts

References 

1987 songs
1987 singles
Bad Boys Blue songs